is a 1976 anime series based on the 1884 novel Adventures of Huckleberry Finn by Mark Twain.  It is the first of two Huckleberry Finn anime. A second Huck Finn television series was made in 1994, Huckleberry Finn Monogatari.

A feature-length English dub of this series was made in the early 1980s, and broadcast on cable TV in the United States.

The English-dubbed version for the episodic TV version of Huckleberry Finn was owned by Saban Entertainment in 1993. 

As with most of the programming library and properties of Saban Entertainment and Fox Children's Productions, the rights to this series is now owned by Disney Enterprises through BVS Entertainment, who acquired the Fox Kids Worldwide franchise in Summer 2001. 

Some episodes of Saban's The Adventures of Huckleberry Finn were released on Region 2 DVD by Maximum Entertainment Ltd. in the 2000s. However, there were no plans to release the English dub version of the series on Region 1 DVD.

Plot summary
At the end of The Adventures of Tom Sawyer, Huck is adopted by the Widow Douglas in return for saving her life.  In Adventures of Huckleberry Finn, in some respects a sequel to The Adventures of Tom Sawyer, the widow attempts to "civilize" the newly rich Huck.

Huck is kidnapped by his father but manages to fake his own death and escape to Jackson's Island, where he coincidentally meets up with Jim, a slave of the Widow Douglas' sister, Miss Watson. Jim is running for freedom because he has found out that Miss Watson plans to "sell him South" for $800. Together they construct a raft and travel on the Mississippi River, Jim hoping for freedom from slavery, and Huck searching freedom from his drunk father and controlling foster parent.

Cast

Main cast
 Masako Nozawa as Huckleberry Finn
 Yasuo Yamada as Jim

Additional cast
 Chikao Otsuka
 Daisuke Umon
 Kei Tomiyama
 Miyoko Aso
 Reiko Mutoh

English dub
 Daniel Brochu as Huckleberry Finn
 Bronwen Mantel as Widder Douglas and Tommy
 Sonja Ball as Jane Watson
 Gary Jewell as Judge Thatcher
 Aron Tager as Pap Finn
 Tyrone Benskin as Jim
 Holly Gauthier-Frankel as Becky
 Arthur Holden as Ben
 Thor Bishopric as Joe
 Teddy Lee Dillon as Bob

Additional voices
 Liz Macrae
 Michael O'Reilly
 Richard M. Dumont
 Terrence Scammell
 Joanna Noyes
 A. J. Henderson
 Susan Glover
 Bruce Dinsmore
 Dean Hagopian (credited as Dean Hagoplan)
 Michael Rudder
 Rick Jones
 Aimée Castle
 Mark Camacho
 Walter Massey
 Jodie Resther

Episode list

Music

See also
 List of films featuring slavery

References

External links 
 
 
 

1976 anime television series debuts
Japanese children's animated adventure television series
Works based on Adventures of Huckleberry Finn
Fuji TV original programming
Group TAC
Television shows based on American novels
Television shows based on children's books
Television shows based on works by Mark Twain